Jamie Masters (born April 14, 1955) is a Canadian former professional ice hockey player. He played in 33 NHL games with the St. Louis Blues over parts of three seasons.

External links
 

1955 births
Living people
Canadian expatriate ice hockey players in Austria
Canadian expatriate ice hockey players in the United States
Canadian ice hockey defencemen
Cincinnati Stingers (CHL) players
EC VSV players
Kansas City Blues players
Ottawa 67's players
Providence Reds players
Salt Lake Golden Eagles (CHL) players
San Diego Mariners draft picks
St. Louis Blues draft picks
St. Louis Blues players
Syracuse Firebirds players
World Hockey Association first round draft picks